Kin recognition, also called kin detection, is an organism's ability to distinguish between close genetic kin and non-kin. In evolutionary biology and psychology, such an ability is presumed to have evolved for inbreeding avoidance, though animals do not typically avoid inbreeding.

An additional adaptive function sometimes posited for kin recognition is a role in kin selection. There is debate over this, since in strict theoretical terms kin recognition is not necessary for kin selection or the cooperation associated with it. Rather, social behaviour can emerge by kin selection in the demographic conditions of 'viscous populations' with organisms interacting in their natal context, without active kin discrimination, since social participants by default typically share recent common origin. Since kin selection theory emerged, much research has been produced investigating the possible role of kin recognition mechanisms in mediating altruism. Taken as a whole, this research suggests that active powers of recognition play a negligible role in mediating social cooperation relative to less elaborate cue-based and context-based mechanisms, such as familiarity, imprinting and phenotype matching.

Because cue-based 'recognition' predominates in social mammals, outcomes are non-deterministic in relation to actual genetic kinship, instead outcomes simply reliably correlate with genetic kinship in an organism's typical conditions. A well-known human example of an inbreeding avoidance mechanism is the Westermarck effect, in which unrelated individuals who happen to spend their childhood in the same household find each other sexually unattractive. Similarly, due to the cue-based mechanisms that mediate social bonding and cooperation, unrelated individuals who grow up together in this way are also likely to demonstrate strong social and emotional ties, and enduring altruism.

Theoretical background
The English evolutionary biologist W. D. Hamilton's theory of inclusive fitness, and the related theory of kin selection, were formalized in the 1960s and 1970s to explain the evolution of social behaviours. Hamilton's early papers, as well as giving a mathematical account of the selection pressure, discussed possible implications and behavioural manifestations. Hamilton considered potential roles of cue-based mechanisms mediating altruism versus 'positive powers' of kin discrimination:

These two possibilities, altruism mediated via 'passive situation' or via 'sophisticated discrimination', stimulated a generation of researchers to look for evidence of any 'sophisticated' kin discrimination. However, Hamilton later (1987) developed his thinking to consider that "an innate kin recognition adaptation" was unlikely to play a role in mediating altruistic behaviours:

The implication that the inclusive fitness criterion can be met by mediating mechanisms of cooperative behaviour that are context and location-based has been clarified by recent work by West et al.:

For a recent review of the debates around kin recognition and their role in the wider debates about how to interpret inclusive fitness theory, including its compatibility with ethnographic data on human kinship, see Holland (2012).

Criticism
Leading inclusive fitness theorists such as Alan Grafen have argued that the whole research program around kin recognition is somewhat misguided:

Others have cast similar doubts over the enterprise:

Experimental evidence
Kin recognition is a behavioral adaptation noted in many species but proximate level mechanisms are not well documented. Recent studies have shown that kin recognition can result from a multitude of sensory input. Jill Mateo notes that there are three components prominent in kin recognition. First, "production of unique phenotypic cues or labels". Second, "perception of these labels and the degree of correspondence of these labels with a 'recognition template'", and finally the recognition of the phenotypes should lead to "action taken by the animal as a function of the perceived similarity between its template and an encountered phenotype".

The three components allow for several possible mechanisms of kin recognition. Sensory information gathered from visual, olfactory and auditory stimuli are the most prevalent. The Belding's ground squirrel kin produce similar odors in comparison to non-kin. Mateo notes that the squirrels spent longer investigating non-kin scents suggesting recognition of kin odor. It's also noted that Belding's ground squirrels produce at least two scents arising from dorsal and oral secretions, giving two opportunities for kin recognition. In addition, the Black Rock Skink is also able to use olfactory stimuli as a mechanism of kin recognition. Egernia saxatilis have been found to discriminate kin from non-kin based on scent. Egernia striolata also use some form of scent, most likely through skin secretions. However, Black Rock Skinks discriminate based on familiarity rather than genotypic similarity. Juvenile E. saxatilis can recognize the difference between the scent of adults from their own family group and unrelated adults. Black Rock Skink recognize their family groups based on prior association and not how genetically related the other lizards are to themselves. Auditory distinctions have been noted among avian species. Long-tailed tits (Aegithalos caudatus) are capable of discriminating kin and non-kin based on contact calls. Distinguishing calls are often learned from adults during the nestling period. Studies suggest that the bald-faced hornet, Dolichovespula maculata, can recognize nest mates by their cuticular hydrocarbon profile, which produces a distinct smell.

Kin recognition in some species may also be mediated by immunogenetic similarity of the major histocompatibility complex (MHC). For a discussion of the interaction of these social and biological kin recognition factors see Lieberman, Tooby, and Cosmides (2007). Some have suggested that, as applied to humans, this nature-nurture interactionist perspective allows a synthesis between theories and evidence of social bonding and cooperation across the fields of evolutionary biology, psychology (attachment theory) and cultural anthropology (nurture kinship).

In plants
Kin recognition is an adaptive behavior observed in living beings to prevent inbreeding, and increase fitness of populations, individuals and genes. Kin recognition is the key to successful reciprocal altruism, a behavior that increases reproductive success of both organisms involved. Reciprocal altruism as a product of kin recognition has been observed and studied in many animals, and more recently, plants. Due to the nature of plant reproduction and growth, plants are more likely than animals to live in close proximity to family members, and therefore stand to gain more from the ability to differentiate kin from strangers.

In recent years, botanists have been conducting studies to determine which plant species can recognize kin, and discover the responses of plants to neighboring kin. Murphy and Dudley (2009) shows that Impatiens pallida has the ability to recognize individuals closely related to them and those not related to them. The physiological response to this recognition is increasingly interesting. I. pallida responds to kin by increasing branchiness and stem elongation, to prevent shading relatives, and responds to strangers by increasing leaf to root allocation, as a form of competition.

Root allocation has been a very common trait shown through research in plants. Limited amounts of biomass can cause trade-offs among the construction of leaves, stems, and roots overall. But, in plants that recognize kin, the movement of resources in the plant has been shown to be affected by proximity to related individuals. It is well documented that roots can emit volatile compounds in the soil and that interactions also occur below-ground between plant roots and soil organisms. This has mainly focused on organisms in the kingdom Animalia, however.

Regarding this, root systems are known to exchange carbon and defense related molecular signals via connected mycorrhizal networks. For instance, it has been demonstrated that tobacco plants can detect the volatile chemical ethylene in order to form a “shade-avoidance phenotype.” Barley plants were also shown to allocate biomass to their roots when exposed to chemical signals from members of the same species, showing that, if they can recognize those signals for competition, recognition of kin in the plant could be likely via a similar chemical response.

Similarly, Bhatt et al. (2010) show that Cakile edentula, the American sea rocket, has the ability to allocate more energy to root growth, and competition, in response to growing next to a stranger, and allocates less energy to root growth when planted next to a sibling. This reduces competition between siblings and increases fitness of relatives growing next to each other, while still allowing competition between non-relative plants.

Little is known about the mechanisms involved in kin recognition. They most likely vary between species as well as within species. A study by Bierdrzycki et al. (2010) shows that root secretions are necessary for Arabidopsis thaliana to recognize kin vs. strangers, but not necessary to recognize self vs. non-self roots. This study was performed using secretion inhibitors, which disabled the mechanism responsible for kin recognition in this species, and showed similar growth patterns to Bhatt et al., (2010) and Murphy and Dudley (2009) in control groups. The most interesting result of this study was that inhibiting root secretions did not reduce the ability of Arabidopsis to recognize their own roots, which implicates a separate mechanism for self/non-self recognition than that for kin/stranger recognition.

While this mechanism in the roots responds to exudates and involves competition over resources like nitrogen and phosphorus, another mechanism has been recently proposed, which involves competition over light, in which kin recognition takes place in leaves. In their 2014 study, Crepy and Casal conducted multiple experiments on different accessions of A. thaliana. These experiments showed that Arabidopsis accessions have distinct R:FR and blue light signatures, and that these signatures can be detected by photoreceptors, which allows the plant to recognize its neighbor as a relative or non-relative. Not much is known about the pathway that Arabidopsis uses to associate these light patterns with kin, however, researchers ascertained that photoreceptors phyB, cry 1, cry 2, phot1, and phot2 are involved in the process by performing a series of experiments with knock-out mutants. Researchers also concluded that the auxin-synthesis gene TAA1 is involved in the process, downstream of the photoreceptors, by performing a similar experiments using Sav3 knock-out mutants. This mechanism leads to altered leaf direction to prevent shading of related neighbors and to reduce competition for sunlight.

Inbreeding avoidance

When mice inbreed with close relatives in their natural habitat, there is a significant detrimental effect on progeny survival. Since inbreeding can be detrimental, it tends to be avoided by many species. In the house mouse, the major urinary protein (MUP) gene cluster provides a highly polymorphic scent signal of genetic identity that appears to underlie kin recognition and inbreeding avoidance.  Thus there are fewer matings between mice sharing MUP haplotypes than would be expected if there were random mating. Another mechanism for avoiding inbreeding is evident when a female house mouse mates with multiple males. In such a case, there appears to be egg-driven sperm selection against sperm from related males.

In toads, male advertisement vocalizations may serve as cues by which females recognize their kin and thus avoid inbreeding.

In dioecious plants, the stigma may receive pollen from several different potential donors. As multiple pollen tubes from the different donors grow through the stigma to reach the ovary, the receiving maternal plant may carry out pollen selection favoring pollen from less related donor plants. Thus, kin recognition at the level of the pollen tube apparently leads to post-pollination selection to avoid inbreeding depression. Also, seeds may be aborted selectively depending on donor–recipient relatedness.

See also
Attachment theory
Inclusive fitness
Kin selection
Nurture kinship

References

Evolutionary biology
Ethology
Kinship and descent
Selection